is a Japanese wheelchair tennis player. She has won 26 major titles, as well as a Paralympic silver and bronze medal in singles and doubles, respectively, at the 2020 Tokyo Paralympics. She also won a bronze medal in singles at the 2016 Rio Paralympics.

Partnering Jordanne Whiley, Kamiji achieved the Grand Slam in doubles in 2014, and also won the Wheelchair Tennis Masters in doubles. Kamiji is the current Wheelchair Tennis Masters champion and is a former junior version.
Kamiji is currently managed by Avex Group under its Avex Challenged Athletes program.

2013–present
Kamiji won singles titles in Iizuka, Daegu, Paris, St Louis, and became the first and so far only non-Dutchwoman to win the tennis Masters title.

Kamiji won doubles titles with Sharon Walraven in Pensacola, Sabine Ellerbrock in Iizuka. Ju-Yeon Park in Daegu, Jordanne Whiley in Paris and the Masters. With Ellerbrock in New York and Whiley at Wimbledon, Kamiji was the runner up.

During the 2014 season Kamiji won singles titles in Melbourne, Kobe and Iizuka. At the Australian Open Kamiji reached her first Grand Slam singles final where she lost to Sabine Ellerbrock. Kamiji followed that up by winning the second Grand Slam tournament of the season at Roland Garros. Whilst partnering Jordanne Whiley during the 2014 season the pair won the Grand Slam in doubles. They finished the year by adding the Masters crown after defeating Louise Hunt and Katharina Krüger in the final. However, despite the absence of van Koot and Griffioen the pair did not go undefeated throughout the tournament as they lost to Marjolein Buis and Michaela Spaanstra during the round robin group stage.

In 2017, Kamiji finished the year as World No 1, and was named ITF Women's Wheelchair World Champion for the second time in her career.

Grand Slam performance timelines

Wheelchair singles

Wheelchair doubles

References

External links
 
 
 Yui Kamiji – profile by Avex Group

1994 births
Living people
Japanese female tennis players
Wheelchair tennis players
Paralympic wheelchair tennis players of Japan
Paralympic bronze medalists for Japan
Paralympic medalists in wheelchair tennis
Medalists at the 2016 Summer Paralympics
Medalists at the 2020 Summer Paralympics
Wheelchair tennis players at the 2012 Summer Paralympics
Wheelchair tennis players at the 2016 Summer Paralympics
People from Akashi, Hyōgo
People with paraplegia
ITF World Champions
21st-century Japanese women